Cyclosomini is a tribe of ground beetles in the family Carabidae. There are about 18 genera and more than 490 described species in Cyclosomini.

Genera
These 18 genera belong to the tribe Cyclosomini:

 Anaulacus W.S.MacLeay, 1825
 Atlantomasoreus Mateu, 1984
 Corsyra Dejean, 1825
 Cyclosomus Latreille, 1829
 Discoptera Semenov, 1889
 Graphipterus Latreille, 1802
 Leuropus Andrewes, 1947
 Lophidius Dejean, 1831
 Masoreus Dejean, 1821
 Mnuphorus Chaudoir, 1873
 Nemotarsus LeConte, 1853
 Odontomasoreus Darlington, 1968
 Piezia Brullé, 1834
 Sarothrocrepis Chaudoir, 1850
 Somoplatodes Basilewsky, 1986
 Somoplatus Dejean, 1829
 Tetragonoderus Dejean, 1829
 Trichopiezia Nègre, 1955

References

External links

 

Lebiinae
Beetle tribes